Egil Georg Harder  (7 April 1917 – 7 April 1997) was a Danish composer.

Notable works
Rokoko-vals (salonorkester 1936)
Juletræet med sin pynt (1940)
Lille suite for strygeorkester (1942)
Den blå anemone 1945)
Spansk dans for orkester (1946)
Romance nr. 1 D-dur (violin and piano 1982)
Romance nr. 2 D-dur (violin and piano 1983)
Liseleje Jubilæumsmarch (1984)
Romance nr. 3 a-mol (violin and piano )
Romance nr. 4 A-dur (violin and piano )
Vuggevise f#-mol

See also
List of Danish composers

References
This article was initially translated from the Danish Wikipedia.

Male composers
1917 births
1997 deaths
20th-century Danish composers
20th-century Danish male musicians